Alex Twal (born 3 July 1996) is a Lebanese international rugby league footballer who plays as a prop and  for the Wests Tigers in the NRL.

Background
Twal was born in Westmead, New South Wales, Australia. He attended Parramatta Marist High School.

Playing career

Early career
A Parramatta City Titans junior, Twal played in the Holden Cup for the Parramatta Eels and was part of their extended first grade squad in 2015 and 2016. He played for the New South Wales under-20s and the Junior Kangaroos in both 2015 and 2016.

2017
Twal signed for the Wests Tigers midway through the 2017 season, from 2018 the end of 2020, before being granted an early release from Parramatta mid-season. He made his first grade debut on 2 July, one day before his 21st birthday, and played in the Tigers remaining eight games for the season, "putting in some seriously consistent performances off the bench." With 249 tackles made and only 5 missed, Twal had the best tackle percentage in the NRL over the regular season.

At season's end, Twal was selected for Lebanon in the World Cup. Teammate Tim Mannah said, "He reminds me of Nathan Brown where his personality is huge, and he’s a player players love to play with. He brings a lot to a team. The Tigers are lucky to have him. He’ll have a really strong career in the NRL." Coach Brad Fittler added, "He plays big minutes for a front-rower, he has a great work ethic, he’s a top kid." After the pool rounds, he was leading the competition in tackles made.

2018
Twal made 21 appearances for Wests in 2018 as the club finished 9th on the table at the end of the regular season and missed out on the finals. He again led the competition with his effective tackle percentage.

2019
After round 17, Twal was rated as the 3rd hardest working player in the NRL. It was said, "Twal continues to keep producing in frightening statistics that continue to improve. The Lebanon international hasn't missed a single tackle since round 10 of the competition."

Twal made 24 appearances for Wests in the 2019 NRL season as the club finished ninth on the table and missed out on the finals.  The club went into the final game of the season knowing that a win over Cronulla would guarantee themselves a finals place but they were defeated 25-8 at Leichhardt Oval.

On 19 November, Twal signed a two-year contract extension to stay with the club until the end of the 2022 season.

2020
Twal played 12 games for Wests in the 2020 NRL season as the club missed out on the finals by finishing 11th.

2021
Twal played a total of 23 games for the Wests Tigers in the 2021 NRL season as the club finished 13th and missed the finals.

2022
On 16 July, Twal was ruled out for the remainder of the 2022 NRL season due to three concussions he sustained throughout the year.

References

External links

NRL profile
Wests Tigers profile
2017 RLWC profile

1996 births
Australian people of Lebanese descent
Wests Tigers players
Rugby league props
Wentworthville Magpies players
Australian rugby league players
Junior Kangaroos players
Living people
Lebanon national rugby league team players
Rugby league players from Sydney